An ersatz good is a substitute good, especially one that is considered inferior to the good it replaces.               

Ersatz may also refer to:

 Ersatz (film), a 1961 short animation
 Ersatz (album), a 2008 album by Julien Doré
 "Ersatz" (short story), a 1967 science fiction short story

See also
 Ersatz Audio, an independent record label
 The Ersatz Elevator, the sixth novel in the book series A Series of Unfortunate Events